On the Attack is a DVD of live recordings and videos of Australian band, The Cat Empire. The package also contains an eight track bonus compact disc.

The concert filming took place between March and June, 2004 and the presentation introduces the band members as it follows them on tour. The bonus disc contains the track The Sun, released on both "The Sun" and "Live @ Adelphia". It also includes a recording of Days Like These, from Bennetts Lane Jazz Club in Melbourne, Australia on 17 May 2004, and a cover of the Eagles' "Hotel California" sung by Harry James Angus in French for Australian alternative radio station Triple J for their segment 'Like a Version'.

DVD Track Listing 
DVD Set list
 "Intro"
 "How to Explain?"
 "Nothing"
 "Days Like These
 "The Rhythm"
 "The Crowd"
 "Hello"
 "The Lost Song"
 "The Chariot"

DVD Encore
 "L'Hotel de Californie"
 The Cat Empire Dancers
 The Happy Sideshow Sword Swallower
 More In The Cage
 "Two Shoes" (UK Tour 2002)
 "The Sun" (US Tour 2002)
 Extreme Merch
 Fusion Song ("(Con)fusion")
 Pop-up Commentary

Bonus CD Track Listing

Certifications

References

External links
 The Cat Empire site

The Cat Empire albums
2004 live albums
2004 video albums
Live video albums